Janina Maultzsch is a German physicist who is the Chair of Experimental Physics at Friedrich-Alexander-Universität Erlangen-Nürnberg. Her research considers the electronic and optical properties of carbon nanomaterials.

Early life and education 
Maultzsch was an undergraduate student at the Technical University of Berlin, where she studied physics. She remained in Berlin for doctoral research, investigating the vibrational properties of carbon allotropes including nanotubes and graphite.

Research and career 
Maultzsch moved to the University of Siegen, where she worked on near field microscopy. She returned to the Technical University of Berlin in late 2004, where she worked as a researcher in the Institute of Solid State Physics. She moved to Columbia University in 2006, working as a postdoctoral researcher with Tony Heinz. She returned to Technical University of Berlin in 2008, where she was made an assistant professor. She is interested in low-dimensional materials, including transition-metal dichalcogenides and graphene.

Maultzsch contributed to the understanding of carbon nanotubes. In particular, she investigated their electronic and vibrational properties. She made use of resonant Raman spectroscopy to uncover the optical transition energies and radial mode frequencies of various metallic and semiconducting nanotubes. She showed that the optical transition energies and electronic structures depend on the chirality index of the nanotube. She revealed that electron-phonon coupling increases for smaller chiral angles.

In 2010, Maultzsch was awarded an ERC Starting Grant focused on the characterisation of carbon nanomaterials. In 2015, she was promoted to full Professor for Novel Materials. In 2017, Maultzsch was appointed the Chair of Experimental Physics at the University of Erlangen–Nuremberg.

Selected publications

References 

 21st-century German physicists
Technical University of Berlin alumni
Academic staff of the University of Erlangen-Nuremberg
German women physicists
Living people
Year of birth missing (living people)